Saw Lon was a queen consort of King Narathihapate of the Pagan Dynasty of Burma (Myanmar). She was a favorite of the king but later executed for trying to poison the king.

Brief
According to the royal chronicles, during one new year's water festival, the king asked a young female attendant to drench Queen Saw Lon with water in front of everyone. The queen was all wet from head to toe, and held a grudge against the king. One day, she put poison in the king's food, and asked a fellow queen Shin Mauk to present it to the king. Chronicles continue that the king was about to eat, the dog below the table sneezed, and the king decided to give the food to the dog. The dog ate it, and died soon after. Saw Lon was arrested. When she admitted to plotting, the king ordered her burned alive inside an iron cage. She was able to delay the execution by a week by heavily bribing her executioners to delay the construction of the cage. She spent her last days in religion, meditating and reviewing her understanding of the Abhidhamma. She was burned alive on the seventh day.

The king nonetheless felt remorse afterwards. He issued a decree stating that his death sentences be suspended for a fortnight to allow his anger to cool.

References

Bibliography
 
 

Queens consort of Pagan